Cartoonito is a European pay television channel that airs animated programming for pre-school children. It is broadcast in Germany, Austria, Switzerland, Benelux, the CIS, Czech Republic, Slovakia, Hungary, Romania, Poland, the Balkans, the Baltics and the Caucasus. Cartoonito was previously the Central and European feed of Boomerang, until it relaunched on 18 March 2023 at 6am CET.

History

As Boomerang (2011–2023) 

On 5 June 2005, Boomerang EMEA was launched on the channel feed as it expanded to Europe. In the first few years the channel was dedicated to select classic animated cartoons, but over the years more recent programming was introduced. On 1 August 2007, the channel continued to roll out across most CEE and Arabic countries by the end of 2010. On 12 October 2011, at 6:00 am (CEST), it was split into two different feeds: this feed focused on Central and Eastern Europe, while Boomerang HQ centered on the Benelux, Cyprus, Czech Republic, Greece, Middle East & Africa, and Portugal. The European feed at the time consisted of four audio tracks, which were in English, Romanian, Hungarian and Polish. On 1 August 2007, TV channel began broadcasting from the Astra 1K and Hot Bird 7A satellites in the territories of the CIS and Baltic countries. The TV channel was partially broadcast in Russian. Since 1 October 2013, the channel has been completely dubbed into Russian.

Between November 2014 and February 2015, Boomerang CEE replaced Boomerang HQ in the Netherlands and Belgium, and got a localized Dutch feed between 2 February 2015 and 2017. Since 2017 the CEE feed is available in the Netherlands and Belgium.

On 4 April 2018, Boomerang CEE switched to the 16:9 aspect ratio. On 1 October 2018, Boomerang CEE replaced Boomerang Germany and took over its channel slot. It launched a subfeed intended to air German advertisements and has no Russian rating icons being displayed in its broadcast, differing from the main feed. Sometimes they were shown anyway because of mistakes.

Since November 10, 2020, Boomerang has received a Czech license (RRTV) in order to ensure the continuation of legal broadcasting in the European Union in accordance with the EU Directive on Audiovisual Media Services (AVMSD) and the law on the single market after the UK leaves the European Union. Since the Czech Republic has minimum broadcasting rules, it was chosen for licensing purposes in the EU. Broadcasting center of the TV channel is still located in London.

On Monday, 1 November 2021, Boomerang CEE launched a new Bulgarian-language audio track, as well as a Bulgarian channel sub-feed for Bulgarian television advertisement commercials, only on Bulsatcom, for now as A1 Bulgaria. On Friday, 3 December 2021, Boomerang CEE launched a new Czech-language audio track.

Due to the Russian invasion of Ukraine, on 9 March 2022, WarnerMedia closed the channel in Russian territories, along with Cartoon Network.

As Cartoonito (2023–present) 
Cartoonito began as programming block in 2011 targeting preschoolers. It aired weekday mornings and afternoons until 2014, when all Cartoonito programming merged into Boomerang's schedule. On 8 August 2022, it was announced that Cartoonito would be returning to Boomerang CEE as part of the brand's 2021 relaunch. 

The block officially returned on 1 September 2022, airing from 8am to 2pm CEST. On 4 January 2023, it was announced that Boomerang CEE would fully rebrand into a dedicated Cartoonito channel on 18 March 2023.

See also 
 Cartoonito (brand as a whole)
 List of programs broadcast by Cartoonito

References

External links 
 Czech Official Site
 Hungarian Official Site
 Dutch Official Site
 German Official Site
 Polish Official Site
 Romanian Official Site
 Bulgarian Official Site

Central and Eastern Europe

2011 establishments in the Czech Republic
2013 establishments in Russia
2018 establishments in Germany
Children's television channels in North Macedonia
Boomerang (TV network)
Defunct television channels in Russia
English-language television stations
German-language television stations
Hungarian-language television stations
Polish-language television stations
Romanian-language television stations
Russian-language television stations
Television channels and stations established in 2005
Television channels and stations established in 2011
Television channels in Albania
Television channels in Belgium
Television channels in Estonia
Television channels in Lithuania
Television channels in North Macedonia
Television channels in Poland
Television channels in Slovakia
Television channels in Slovenia
Television channels in the Netherlands
Television networks in Hungary
Television stations in Austria
Television stations in Germany
Television stations in Romania
Television stations in Switzerland
Television stations in the Czech Republic
Turner Broadcasting System Europe
Turner Broadcasting System Germany
Turner Broadcasting System Netherlands
Turner Broadcasting System Poland
Turner Broadcasting System Romania
Turner Broadcasting System Russia
Warner Bros. Discovery EMEA